Iowa Highway 16 (Iowa 16) is a state highway running from west to east in southeastern Iowa. The western terminus of Iowa Highway 16 is at an intersection with U.S. Highway 34 (US 34) between Agency and Batavia. The eastern terminus is located at Wever at an intersection with US 61.

Route description
It heads south along a two-lane road where it passes the campus of Cardinal School District. The highway jogs to the east and then back to the south before it arrives in Eldon. Upon entering Eldon, the road turns to the southeast in order to follow the course of the Des Moines River; the roadway runs roughly parallel to the river until Selma. On the east side of Eldon, tourists are directed to the American Gothic House, made famous by the painting by Iowa artist Grant Wood. Southeast of Eldon, the road clips the northeastern corner of Davis County as it runs through the river's floodplain to Selma. Now in Van Buren County, it passes a quarry and then turns to the east. The highway meets Iowa 98 north of Douds. The road goes through a series of curves that take it further south until it straightens out near the northern intersection with Iowa 1.

The two highways briefly overlap between Birmingham and Keosauqua; Iowa 16 turns off of Iowa 1 to continue east.  Once it enters Lee County, the highway takes a sharp curve to the south and then another sharp curve to the east.  It runs due east through Houghton and then meets the four-lane US 218 / Iowa 27, the Avenue of the Saints highway, at an at-grade intersection.  The road continues its general east-and-south path through Denmark.  The highway ends at an intersection with US 61 between Wever and the Skunk River.

History
The current version of Iowa Highway 16 is the second occurrence of the route number in the state; the route number first occurred on a highway that was decommissioned in 1930 and ran between the Minnesota and Missouri state lines.

Major intersections

References

016